Qeshlaq-e Sufilar may refer to:
 Qeshlaq-e Sufilar Hajj Mirza Ali Aqa
 Qeshlaq-e Sufilar Hamid